This is a list of all cricketers who have played first-class, list A or Twenty20 cricket for Tamil Nadu cricket team (formerly called Madras cricket team). Seasons given are first and last seasons; the player did not necessarily play in all the intervening seasons. Players in bold have played international cricket.

Last updated at the end of the 2015/16 season.

A
 George Abraham, 1949/50 - 1952/53
 Antony Adams, 1975/76 - 1978/79
 William Adams, 1936/37
 Habib Ahmed, 1961/62 - 1962/63
 Balu Alaganan, 1946/47 - 1954/55
 Ashique Ali, 1995/96 - 1996/97
 Shabir Ali, 1975/76
 Bellipadi Chandrahasa Alva, 1944/45 - 1954/55
 Bellipadi Sridhar Alva, 1953/54 - 1958/59
 Palani Amarnath, 2006/07 - 2012/13
 P. B. Anand, 1994/95
 A. Ananthanarayanan, 1943/44 - 1946/47
 Baba Aparajith, 2011/12 - 2015/16
 Thirugnanasambandam Arasu, 1998/99 - 2001/02
 V. Aruldass, 1945/46 - 1950/51
 Bharat Arun, 1982/83 - 1991/92
 Krishnan Arunkumar, 1984/85 - 1988/89
 Varadarajan Arunkumar, 2010/11
 P. R. Ashokanand, 1961/62
 Murugan Ashwin, 201213 - 2015/16
 Ravichandran Ashwin, 2006/07 - 2015/16

B
 R. Babulnath, 1980/81
 Hemang Badani, 1996/97-2006/07
 Subramaniam Badrinath, 2000/01-2013/14
 K. Balaji, 1974/75-1979/80
 Lakshmipathy Balaji, 2001/02-2015/16
 S. Balaji, 1980/81
 M. K. Balakrishnan, 1952/53-1961/62
 S. Balakrishnan, 1953/54-1956/57
 M. Balasubramaniam, 1953/54-1956/57
 M. Baliah, 1935/36-1936/37
 H. D. Ballal, 1963/64-1965/66
 Prakash Bangara, 1953/54-1958/59
 Patamada Belliappa, 1959/60-1973/74
 B. S. R. Bhadradri, 1937/38-1943/44
 N. Bharathan, 1976/77
 C. K. Bhaskaran, 1966/67-1968/69
 Rajat Bhatia, 1999/00-2001/02
 M. G. Bhavanarayanan, 1952/53-1955/56
 M. V. Bobjee, 1945/46-1949/50

C
 Robert Carrick, 1926/27
 D. L. Chakravarti, 1949/50-1956/57
 Seetharaman Chandramouli, 1996/97-1997/98
 D. T. Chandrasekar, 2014/15-2015/16
 V. B. Chandrasekhar, 1986/87-1994/95
 R. Chandrasekharan, 1962/63
 Cherry Chandy, 1956/57
 Thiruvenkati Chari, 1934/35-1939/40
 Raghunath Chinnadorai, 1950/51-1958/59
 Aswin Crist, 2013/14-2015/16

D
 Michael Dalvi, 1967/68-1976/77
 Safi Darashah, 1930/31
 Anthony Das, 2014/15-2015/16
 S. G. Deenan, 1937/38-1941/42
 Damodaran Devanand, 1995/96-1999/00
 V. Devendran, 2006/07
 Devarasan Dhandapani, 2001/02-2003/04
 P. K. Dharmalingam, 1965/66-1969/70
 Patrick Dickinson, 1952/53
 Thiruvengala Doraiappan, 1963/64-1970/71
 T. M. Doraiswami, 1936/37-1940/41
 G. S. Dutt, 1946/47
 Dakshina Murthy, 1948/49-1955

E
 Akbar Ebrahim, 1984/85-1985/86
 Lawrence Edmonds, 1972/73-1974/75
 Napoleon Einstein, 2006/07-2013/14

F
 Peter Fernandez, 1980/81
 Patrick Furtado, 1951/52-1952/53

G
 C. Ganapathy, 2003/04-2011/12
 C. R. Ganapathy, 1926/27-1935/36
 Kaushik Gandhi, 2011/12-2015/16
 S. Ganesan, 1949/50-1950/51
 M. Gautam, 1977/78-1985/86
 Narayanan Gautam, 1988/89-1993/94
 Anand George, 1998/99-1999/00
 Richard George, 1935/36-1936/37
 J. S. Ghanshyam, 1970/71
 Dwarkanath Girish, 1984/85-1988/89
 T. V. Girish, 1950/51
 E. Godfrey, 1935/36
 D. J. Gokulakrishnan, 1993/94-2003/04
 M. S. Gopal, 1934/35-1943/44
 S. Gopalakrishnan, 1969/70-1970/71
 M. J. Gopalan, 1926/27-1951/52
 C. D. Gopinath, 1949/50-1962/63
 Harikrishnan Gopinath, 2006/07-2014/15
 Sunny Gupta, 2011/12

H
 Syed Mohammad Hadi, 1932/33
 C. K. Haridas, 1941/42
 Sunil Haridas, 1973/74-1974/75
 Susheel Haridas, 1971/72-1974/75
 Harjinder Singh, 1981/82
 J. C. Hart, 1957/58
 Jawad Hussain, 1964/65
 Najam Hussain, 1966/67-1969/70
 Syed Mohammad Hussain, 1926/27-1933/34

I
 Baba Indrajith, 2013/14-2015/16

J
 Abdul Jabbar, 1972/73-1986/87
 Tanveer Jabbar, 1993/94-1999/00
 V. Jagannathan, 1930/31
 Jagdish Singh, 1963/64-1968/6
 Edward Jeffares, 1948/49
 Rajamani Jesuraj, 2003/04-2011/12
 C. P. Johnstone, 1926/27-1944/45
 Henry Joynt, 1957/58

K
 B. Kalyanasundaram, 1968/69-1977/78
 M. S. Kamath, 1959/60-1961/62
 K. S. Kannan, 1941/42-1956/57
 N. Kannayiram, 1948/49-1956/57
 Kanwaljit Singh, 1986/87
 Aashish Kapoor, 1989/90-2006/07
 Arun Karthik, 2007/08-2013/14
 Dinesh Karthik, 
2002/03-2019/20
 Karthick Veerabaghu ,2003/04-2007/08
 Bahirathan Karthikeyan, 2002/03
 M. C. Karthikeyan, 1940/41
 Thalaisayanam Karunamurthy, 1995/96-1996/97
 Jagannathan Kaushik, 2011/12-2015/16
 Guru Kedarnath, 2005/06
 Shahrukh Khan, 2013/14-2015/16
 Bharat Khanna, 1933/34
 J. Kousik, 2015/16
 A. G. Kripal Singh, 1950/51-1964/65
 Arjan Kripal Singh, 1988/89-1994/95
 Swaran Kripal Singh, 1985/86
 S. M. Krishnakumar, 1975/76
 P. K. Krishnamurthy, 1959/60
 K. Krishnappa, 1935/36
 A. V. Krishnaswami, 1930/31-1943/44
 C. V. Krishnaswami, 1943/44-1946/47
 K. Krishnaswami, 1947/48
 Ajjampur Krishnaswamy, 1962/63
 V. Krishnaswamy, 1970/71-1979/80
 K. Bharath Kumar, 1977/78-1982/83
 Dharma Kumar, 2010/11
 Ganesh Kumar, 1998/99-2003/04
 C. Hemanth Kumar, 2000/01-2005/06
 M. M. Kumar, 1959/60-1960/61
 S. Kumar, 1997/98
 Santosh Kumar, 1979/80-1982/83
 Shanmugham Senthil Kumar, 2005/06
 Valapathy Senthil Kumar, 1997/98
 K. Shiv Kumar, 1994/95
 Selvam Suresh Kumar, 2007/08-2014/15
 Varun Kumar, 2006/07
 U. S. Kumar, 1989/90-1991/92
 Vaman Kumar, 1955/56-1976/77
 Vasant Kumar, 1996/97-1998/99
 Vikram Kumar, 2001/02-2004/05
 Tamil Kumaran, 2003/04-2009/10
 Thirunavukkarasu Kumaran, 1996/97-2001/02
 V. J. Kumaraswamy, 1976/77

L
 C. K. Lakshmanan, 1930/31
 John Law, 1940/41-1941/42
 Sinderraj Lokenderraj, 1960/61

M
 Robert McIntosh, 1933/34
 John McIver, 1937/38
 Jayaraman Madanagopal, 1998/99-2003/04
 Kunjiran Madhavan, 1956/57 - 1966/67
 N. P. Madhavan, 1980/81-1984/85
 Rangachari Madhavan, 1982/83-1989/90
 Sadagoppan Mahesh, 1993/94-2002/03
 Yo Mahesh, 2004/05-2014/15
 Subramani Mani, 1958/59-1960/61
 S. V. S. Mani, 1961/62-1970/71
 Vikram Mani, 2006/07
 S. S. Manoharan, 1937/38
 Ramdas Mardi, 1947/48-1949/50
 Jakkaladaki Maruthi, 1963/64
 Petson Mathew, 2003/04
 Satyajit Medappa, 1999/00
 Siddharth Medappa, 1998/99
 A. G. Milkha Singh, 1958/59-1968/69
 Patrick Miller, 1930/31
 Rashid Mirza, 1972/73
 Ravi Mishra, 1984/85-1985/86
 Urmikant Mody, 1968/69
 M. Mohammed, 2012/13-2015/16
 Syed Mohammed, 2005/06-2010/11
 K. Mohanakrishnan, 1939/40-1941/42
 P. S. Moses, 1976/77-1984/85
 Mujib-ur-Rehman, 1989/90-1991/92
 T. M. Murari, 1962/63-1965/66
 Abhinav Mukund, 2007/08-2015/16
 P. Mukund, 1970/71-1979/80
 Kommireddi Murthy, 1966/67-1967/68
 M. K. Murugesh, 1953/54-1958/59

N
 S. Nagaswamy, 1961/62
 Ren Nailer, 1926/27-1944/45
 C. K. Nainakannu, 1935/36-1941/42
 T. S. Narasimhan, 1952/53
 S. Narayanan, 1969/70
 Ramadoss Naresh, 2003/04-2007/08
 S. Nataraj, 1969/70-1975/76
 Thangarasu Natarajan, 2014/15
 C. K. Nayudu, 1926/27

P
 Gopal Pai, 1951/52-1953/54
 Phiroze Palia, 1933/34
 Prasanth Parameswaran, 2014/15
 T. S. Parankusam, 1935/36-1944/45
 C. D. Parthasarathi, 1935/36-1937/38
 Gopalaswami Parthasarathi, 1936/37-1943/44
 R. T. Parthasarathi, 1947/48-1955/56
 T. V. Parthasarathi, 1943/44
 Mandayam Parthasarathy, 1981/82-1982/83
 Huzefa Patel, 2004/05-2005/06
 Jayantibhai Patel, 1956/57-1966/67
 S. K. Patel, 1975/76-1976/77
 Reuben Paul, 1995/96-2000/01
 Alexander Penfold, 1925/26-1926/27
 R. M. Perumal, 1945/46-1949/50
 premraj anand, 2022/23-2033/34
 Terence Peterson, 1936/37
 E. C. Phillip, 1943/44-1947/48
 R. Prabhakar, 1966/67-1974/75
 Murthy Prabhu, 2009/10-2014/15
 M. V. Prakash, 1947/48-1949/50
 P. C. Prakash, 1985/86-1989/90
 V. Prasad, 1982/83
 Ramaswamy Prasanna, 2006/07-2015/16
 Hari Prasanth, 1997/98-1998/99
 Chelliah Prathiban, 2012/13
 Theodore Pritchett, 1930/31

R
 Udamalpet Radhakrishnan, 1987/88
 George Rae, 1936/37-1937/38
 R. Raghavan, 1954/55-1959/60
 R. Raghavan, 1952/53
 R. Raghavan, 1965/66
 Raju Raghuram, 2004/05
 Mohan Rai, 1955/56-1962/63
 Kakkudasam Rajagopal, 1966/67-1969/70
 V. Rajagopalan, 1972/73
 V. Rajaram, 1963/64-1965/66
 K. Rajendran, 1959/60-1967/68
 Natarajan Rajendran, 1963/64-1965/66
 Padmanabhan Rajesh, 1995/96-1996/97
 Immanuel Rajkumar, 1986/87
 A. C. Rajmanickam, 1958/59
 Padmanabhan Raju, 2002/03-2003/04
 Narasimhan Ram, 1965/66
 P. S. Ramachandran, 1934/35-1941/42
 T. Ramachandran, 1943/44-1945/46
 Y. Ramachandran, 1953/54-1957/58
 J. Ramakrishnan, 1954/55-1958/59
 K. S. Ramamurthi, 1936/37
 W. V. Raman, 1982/83-1998/99
 P. V. Ramanathan, 1934/35-1935/36
 B. V. Ramanujam, 1934/35-1935/36
 Cotah Ramaswami, 1926/27-1941/42
 Cota Ramaswaroop, 1957/58
 Janardhanan Ramdas, 1988/89-1989/90
 K. J. Ramadyani, 1978/79
 P. Ramesh, 1974/75-1980/81
 R. Ramesh, 1970/71
 Ran Ramesh, 1963/64-1972/73
 Sadagoppan Ramesh, 1995/96-2004/05
 Shankaranarayanan Ramesh, 1993/94-1994/95
 Srinivasan Ramesh, 1990/91
 Ramakrishnan Ramkumar, 2001/02-2007/08
 Raja of Ramnad, 1941/42
 A. G. Ram Singh, 1932/33-1946/47
 C. R. Rangachari, 1938/39-1953/54
 Mark Ranganathan, 1934/35-1935/36
 T. Ranganathan, 1947/48
 Malolan Rangarajan, 2011/12-2015/16
 Kolar Ananthaswamy Rao, 1957/58-1959/60
 Balaji Rao, 1967/68-1969/70
 Balaji Rao, 1994/95-2000/01 (played international cricket for Canada)
 Ganapathy Rao, 1951/52
 B. S. Krishna Rao, 1940/41-1946/47
 Madhava Rao, 1938/39-1941/42
 Narayanaswami Rao, 1936/37-1939/40
 Prabhakar Rao, 1956/57-1966/67
 Rammohan Rao, 1978/79-1980/81
 Vasudeva Rao, 1960/61
 Venkatesh Rao, 1961/62
 Vivek Razdan, 1990/91
 Bharath Reddy, 1973/74-1985/86
 Cyril Reed, 1937/38
 Frederick Richardson, 1943/44-1944/45
 William Robins, 1937/38-1938/39
 Maurice Robinson, 1944/45
 Robin Singh, 1985/86-2001/02
 Francis Rogers, 1933/34

S
 Sunil Sam, 2010/11-2014/15
 M. Sambandam, 1936/37
 Mullassery Sanjay, 1988/89-1995/96
 Martin Sanjeev, 2011/12
 A. K. Sarangapani, 1949/50-1955/56
 Arjun Sarathy, 2004/05
 Vasanth Saravanan, 1997/98-2002/03
 Thalaivan Sargunam, 2012/13
 Harihara Sastry, 1955/56
 Rajagopal Sathish, 2000/01-2015/16
 A. G. Satwender Singh, 1963/64-1975/76
 B. R. Sekhar, 1959/60-1967/68
 T. A. Sekhar, 1976/77-1987/88
 Mylvahanan Senthilnathan, 1987/88-1997/98
 E. H. D. Sewell, 1894/95
 Rahil Shah, 2011/12-2015/16
 Shahabuddin, 1932/33
 Bharath Shankar, 2014/15-2015/16
 R. Shankar, 1970/71
 Vijay Shankar, 2011/12-2019/20
 Sridharan Sharath, 1992/93-2006/07
 Arnold Shaw, 1934/35-1935/36
 Rajasekhar Shetty, 1953/54
 Mumbai Shrinivas, 2000/01-2006/07
 Poll Shyamsunder, 1953/54-1955/56
 Subramania Siva, 2009/10
 Mooverjanthali Sivakumar, 2004/05-2009/10
 M. Sivanath, 1932/33
 Ramanathan Sivaprakasham, 1990/91
 Laxman Sivaramakrishnan, 1981/82-1997/98
 Vidyut Sivaramakrishnan, 1999/00-2009/10
 Venkataraman Sivaramakrishnan, 1973/74-1989/90
 Archibald Southby, 1935/36-1936/37
 Ralph Spitteler, 1938/39
 A. R. Sridhar, 1950/51-1958/59
 Mirmisa Sridhar, 1969/70
 Veerragha Sridhar, 1957/58-1961/62
 Anirudha Srikkanth, 2003/04-2015/16
 Krishnamachari Srikkanth, 1978/79-1992/93
 Krishnaraj Srinath, 1995/96-1996/97
 Aushik Srinivas, 2009/10-2015/16
 Krishnamachari Srinivasan, 1993/94
 M. O. Srinivasan, 1941/42-1948/49
 Muthuswami Srinivasan, 1957/58-1964/65
 Rajhamanny Srinivasan, 2007/08
 Sampathkumar Srinivasan, 1986/87
 Sankaran Srinivasan, 1979/80-1984/85
 T. E. Srinivasan, 1970/71-1983/84
 Sridharan Sriram, 1993/94-2005/06
 S. P. Sriramulu, 1959/60
 Anthony Stansfeld, 1938/39-1947/48
 John Stephenson, 1930/31
 Prathaban Subbiah, 1998/99
 M. Subramaniam, 1959/60
 Sunil Subramaniam, 1988/89-1997/98
 H. Sundaram, 1974/75-1977/78
 P. R. Sundaram, 1959/60
 Venkat Sunderam, 1973/74
 Sunny Singh, 2011/12
 Chinnaswamy Suresh, 2006/07-2008/09
 Esak Suresh, 2003/04-2007/08
 Somasetty Suresh, 1999/00-2004/05
 A. P. Sureshkumar, 1986/87-1989/90
 C. S. Sureshkumar, 1982/83-1987/88
 Laxmesha Suryaprakash, 2014/15
 M. Suryanarayan, 1950/51-1955/56
 N. Suryanarayan, 1941/42-1948/49
 Umashankar Sushil, 2008/09-2014/15
 Rangaraj Suthesh, 2008/09-2010/11
 M. Swaminathan, 1940/41-1952/53
 Swaranjit Singh, 1958/59
 N. N. Swarna, 1930/31-1934/35
 Samburudeen.MP,  2004/05-
2011/12

T
 Abhishek Tanwar, 2015/16
 Vikram Thambuswamy, 1967/68
 George Thomas, 1962/63-1969/70
 B. S. Thyagarajan, 1935/36-1936/37

U
 M. A. Uttappa, 1933/34-1935/36

V
 K. S. Vaidyanathan, 1964/65-1965/66
 S. V. Vaidyanathan, 1952/53-1960/61
 Sunil Valson, 1981/82
 P. V. Varadan, 1937/38-1941/42
 V. R. Varadarajan, 1936/37
 R. Vasan, 1982/83
 Divakar Vasu, 1987-1998/99
 K. Vasudevadas, 2003/04-2014/15
 Kennimbeli Vasudevamurthy, 1961/62
 S. Vasudevan, 1974/75-1988/89
 Sundaram Vasudevan, 2003/04
 M. K. Velu, 1953/54
 Srinivasaraghavan Venkataraghavan, 1963/64-1984/85
 M. Venkataramana, 1987/88-1998/99
 M. Venkataramanjulu, 1925/26-1934/35
 N. J. Venkatesan, 1939/40-1951/52
 R. Venkatesan, 1959/60
 Rajgopalan Venkatesh, 1985/86-1986/87
 J. S. Versey-Brown, 1940/41
 Ganapathi Vignesh, 2001/02-2010/11
 Krishnamoorthy Vignesh, 2013/14
 Lakshminarayanan Vignesh, 2015/16
 Murali Vijay, 2005/06-2015/16
 P. Vijayakumar, 1975/76-1982/83
 P. Vijayaraghavan, 1970/71
 Mani Vikram, 2006/07
 Sunil Viswanathan, 1998/99-2003/04
 Viswesh Lakshmanan, 2008-2010

W
 Humphrey Ward, 1925/26-1938/39
 Harry White, 1932/33

References

Tamil Nadu cricketers

cricketers